The Hewitt School is a K-12 independent girls' school located on New York City's Upper East Side.  The school teaches girls to become ethical leaders. The school serves girls in three divisions: Lower School (K-4), Middle School (5-8), and Upper School (9-12).

At Hewitt, students in kindergarten through twelfth grade work on understanding real-world problems and developing solutions toward shared goals. Hewitt girlsreceive preparation for higher education and professional careers.

History
Caroline D. Hewitt founded the Hewitt School in 1920. Hewitt was born in England and educated there. She came to the United States in 1902 as a private tutor to a prominent family in Tuxedo Park, New York. After a decade in that position and at the suggestion of the Hoffman family, Hewitt began private classes for children in a townhouse on the Upper East Side. At this time the school was referred to as Miss Hewitt's Classes. By 1920, Hewitt had established a small kindergarten for boys and girls located at the Mannes Music School. Over time, the school expanded and began to exclusively educate young women.

In 1942 Hewitt retired and was succeeded by faculty member Charlotte Comfort. In 1950, the school was granted a charter as a nonprofit corporation. The school moved to its current location at 45 East 75th Street in 1951. In 1955 Miss Hewitt's Classes became The Hewitt School. In 1968, the Gregory Building, named for board of trustees president William Gregory, was built. In 1969 Janet Mayer succeeded Comfort as headmistress and served until her retirement eleven years later. In 1976 the Building Fund Drive added three new stories to the Gregory Building. In 1980 Agathe Crouter succeeded Mayer as headmistress and served until her retirement in 1990. In 1986 a major renovation of the 75th Street Building was completed, adding classroom space and the John and Elizabeth Hobbs Performing Arts Center. In 1990 Mary Jane Yurchak became head of school and then took on a leadership role in integrating academics and technology. In 2000 Linda MacMurray Gibbs became head of school and initiated a long-term plan for its growth. In 2001 the Hewitt community went online, and a revised course of study based on the curriculum mapping process was initiated. In 2002, with a gift from the McKelvey Foundation, Hewitt purchased another townhouse to accommodate the Lower School, beginning in the fall of 2003. This building is named McKelvey in honor of trustee Andrew McKelvey. Also in 2003, a major renovation of the library was completed. Joan Lonergan served as Hewitt's seventh head of school. Lonergan assumed this position in July 2010. In her five-year tenure, Lonergan led the expansion of the school; the townhouse to the west of the Gregory Building was purchased. Beginning in July 2015, a complete renovation of the buildings was funded and planned under Lonergan's leadership.

In November 2014, The Hewitt School's board president announced that Tara Christie Kinsey would be the eighth head of school. Kinsey's tenure began on July 1, 2015. Dr. Kinsey is committed to granting girls and young women access to the kind of education and leadership development that expands their confidence, capacities, and sense of purpose in forging a better world. A lifelong learner, educator, coach, and leader, Dr. Kinsey received her A.B. in English from Princeton University, where she was a varsity athlete, and her Ph.D. in English from Emory University. Dr. Kinsey is a teacher and scholar of modern and contemporary British and Irish literature. She began her teaching career at Peddie School and has taught at Emory University, Oxford University, Georgetown University, and Princeton University.

Academics
Student-directed, purpose-driven, and joyful learning is a cornerstone of a Hewitt education. Hewitt's academic program is modeled around four academic pillars: presence, empathy, research, and purpose. Inspired by the school’s mission and vision, Hewitt’s classes are designed to build students’ leadership capacity and sense of purpose in the world through immersion in complex, real-world challenges. 

The Hewitt School provides STEM education, introducing design challenges in science, technology, engineering, and mathematics classes starting in the lower school. Every student K-12 gets hands-on experience designing, building, programming, and driving robots, and middle and high school students have the option to join Hewitt Robotics, the school’s competitive VEX EDR and VEX IQ robotics programs. Other important areas of focus are the foreign language program, the creative arts program, which includes both visual and performing arts, and varsity sports teams.

The Center for Gender and Ethical Leadership in Society 
The Center for Gender and Ethical Leadership in Society is a research initiative within The Hewitt School dedicated to designing a K-12 academic program that improves girls’ lives and outcomes both in school and in the workplace. Through the work of Hewitt’s distinguished research partners (including Dr. Carol Gilligan) and current research projects, the Center inspires girls and young women to forge a more gender equitable workforce and society, both for themselves and for the many generations of girls and young women to follow.

Co-curricular activities
 Hewitt annually participates in New York City's Middle School Model Congress.
 Hewitt competes in cross country, track and field, tennis, soccer, volleyball, squash, basketball, and badminton.
 Hewitt Robotics team regularly qualify for VEX IQ State Championships and have competed in the VEX Robotics Competition World Championships.
Hewitt's Middle School Sustainability and Social Activism Committee is dedicated to creating sustainable and ethical practices within the Hewitt community and throughout New York.
Hewitt puts on several student productions each year, including an upper school play, middle and upper school musical, middle school play, and a series of music concerts.

Campus

The Hewitt School is housed in four connected buildings on the Upper East Side of Manhattan. The Upper School (9-12) and Middle School (housed in the adjacent buildings: Gregory Hall, Stillman Hall, and Winslow Hall) (5-8) are housed at 45 East 75th Street near Frick Madison between Madison and Park Avenues. The McKelvey Lower School (K-4) is in a townhouse at 3 East 76th Street just off Central Park.

Hewitt's four townhouses contain state-of-the-art science labs, art studios, innovation labs, gymnasium and photography labs. The nearby Central Park provides grounds for outdoor activities and Theater at St. Jean's is used for theater productions.

On September 6, 2017, Hewitt expanded its campus with the opening of Winslow Hall, an adjoining townhouse on 76th Street. The building is named for Ann Winslow Donelly (Hewitt class of 1966) and was designed by Robert A.M. Stern Architects. It includes a lab for STEM programming and 10 new classrooms.

Notable alumnae
Phoebe Cates, American actress and entrepreneur
Sophie Beem, songwriter
Joan W. Patten, American sculptor, scholar, and preservationist of Mayan art 
Sheila Rabb Weidenfeld, former Press Secretary to First Lady Betty Ford and Special Assistant to President Gerald Ford
Lee Remick, Academy Award-nominated° actress
Christina Onassis, Greek heiress and daughter of shipping magnate Aristotle Onassis
Judith Peabody, philanthropist
Athina Livanos, heiress of shipping magnate George S. Livanos
Mary Duke Biddle Trent Semans, philanthropist and heiress
Nikki Finke, journalist, publisher and blogger 
Brenda Frazier, Depression era debutante
Julie Harris, Tony and Emmy Award-winning actress, Academy Award nominee.
Margaret Campbell, Duchess of Argyll, British socialite
Barbara Hutton, heiress to the Woolworth fortune
Lady Pamela Hicks, daughter of Louis Mountbatten, 1st Earl Mountbatten of Burma, a British admiral and statesman
Patricia Knatchbull, 2nd Countess Mountbatten of Burma, daughter of Earl Mountbatten
Edith Kingdon Gould, poet, linguist, and actress
Betsy von Furstenberg, stage and screen actress and writer
Jean Stein, author and editor
Cobina Wright, opera singer, actress, and syndicated gossip-columnist

Memberships/Affiliations

 The National Association of Independent Schools (NAIS)
 The New York State Association of Independent Schools (NYSAIS)
 The Parents League of New York
 Independent School Admission Association of Greater New York (ISAAGNY)
 The International Coalition of Girls Schools
 Prep for Prep

References

External links
 The Hewitt School Website

 Educational institutions established in 1920
 Private K-12 schools in Manhattan
 Preparatory schools in New York City
 Girls' schools in New York City

 1920 establishments in New York (state)